The 1900 Greensburg Athletic Association season was Greensburg Athletic's 10th and last season. The American football team finished with a record of 3–6–1.

Schedule

Game notes

References

Greensburg Athletic Association
Greensburg Athletic Association seasons
Greensburg Athletic Association